Neelasaari is a 1976 Indian Malayalam film,  directed by M. Krishnan Nair and produced by Kalanilayam Krishnan Nair. The film stars Adoor Bhasi, Jose Prakash, Adoor Bhavani and Ravikumar in the lead roles. The film has musical score by V. Dakshinamoorthy.

Cast

Adoor Bhasi
Jose Prakash
Adoor Bhavani
Ravikumar
Sumithra

Soundtrack
The music was composed by V. Dakshinamoorthy and the lyrics were written by Cheri Viswanath and Pappanamkodu Lakshmanan.

References

External links
 

1976 films
1970s Malayalam-language films
Films directed by M. Krishnan Nair